Time Travelling Toaster (also known as TTT, Triple T, Trippy T or simply Toaster) is an alter ego or persona of a currently unknown experimental multi-genre music producer, electronic musician, and visual artist whose stage name is possibly based on the episode Treehouse of Horror V from The Simpsons. The producer's self-acclaimed concept is that of an amorphous, anonymous, space-bound being that utilizes time travel to collect and mix different eras of music which attributes to the hip hop undertone, sampling and electronic themes presented. Toaster's mythology within its universe is further explored on the producer's social media outlets. Very little is known of the origins of Time Travelling Toaster such as, gender, ethnicity, age, as all are undocumented besides the composer claiming origins to Japan.

History 

To its own account, the origins of the producer come from the persona having a trip from psilocybin usage to which the entity spontaneously formed. Many of Time Travelling Toaster's self-acclaimed attributes are based on fictional comic book superpowers such as telepathy, telekinesis, energy and sound manipulation; to which the producer claims is a process to its sound design.

The producer is usually depicted with a piece(s) of toasted bread, or a toaster with toasted bread showing. Like fellow producer and musical artist Madlib's Quasimoto and Flying Lotus's Captain Murphy alter egos, the music is very story centric to the respective persona's world and experiences. Toaster has an ongoing beat tape series called "SPACE TOAST" based on the Space Ghost Coast to Coast cartoon series. "Spacebump #2", from the series's second release SPACE TOAST VOL. 2, was featured on writer and actor Kevin Allison's weekly podcast radio show RISK!.

During 2011, Toaster was first publicly introduced on popular European marijuana activist podcast Dopefiend.co.uk with bump music, starting the producer's fanbase. In 2013, Time Travelling Toaster released Color Spacesound Turbulence, a debut EP which showcases explorative electronic themes with few hip hop involvement. The experimental effort, though lacking thicker sonics, are more explored in later releases.

Sinus Roris (Latin for "Bay of Dew"), Toaster's debut album, was released digitally in March 2014. Sinus Roris, based on an impact location on the moon, is a more raw and darker attempt exploring themes of the moon landing, selenography, and moon myths. The album was a departure from the previous light tones presented in Color Spacesound Turbulence, focusing more on grittier hip hop movements, electronic-jazz fusion, and break beat. Corry Banks, co-founder and lead editor of hip-hop culture website BBOY Tech Report, in a 2014 highlight for Sinus Roris states, "‘TTT’, as we affectionately call him, was declared one of our 13 favorite beatmakers of 2013 and deservedly so.". Banks also added, "His projects show a fixation with the mysteries and beauties of space and ‘Sinus Roris’,..., continues to chronicle the journeys of an intrepid explorer of those vast and enigmatic expanses.". Music from 'Sinus Roris' was featured on segment of a video podcast on DoubleToasted.com.

In August, 2014, TTT contributed to electronic music and culture website EverythingIsChemical.com's monthly EICV7 mixtape series, providing the 82nd edition.

Time Travelling Toaster and recording artist Tone Royal (Ray Villareal) from DoubleToasted.com announced plans for a collaborative project set to release late 2016 or early 2017. Toaster releases new music on its official SoundCloud, Bandcamp, and blog.

Personality 
Toaster as a character, heavily references time travel, alternate universes, dimensions and incorporating obscure space terms to create music usually within genres of hip-hop, psychedelic, and electronic. Reminiscent to Marvin the Martian, when communicating via social media outlets, the producer refers to people as "earthlings". Toaster refers to its music as 'travels', and fans of the producer are known as "travelers". It is yet known if Time Travelling Toaster is a single solo artist, group or collaborative effort. In an episode of The Simpsons entitled Treehouse of Horror V, a parody of A Sound of Thunder, while attempting to fix a broken toaster, Homer accidentally turns it into a time machine.

Influences and style 
Time Travelling Toaster itself has cited J Dilla, Madlib, Flying Lotus, and japanese animation, time travel, and astrology as musical influences.

Discography

Solo albums 
 Sinus Roris (digitally-released, Time Travelling Toaster, March 2014)

EPs 
 Color Spacesound Turbulence ( self-released, Jun 2013)
 Visits To Planet Earth ( self-released, May 2014)

Series 
 "SPACE TOAST VOL. 1" (self-released June 2012)
 "SPACE TOAST VOL. 2" (self-released March 2013)
 "SPACE TOAST VOL. 3" (self-released August 2013)

Mixtapes 
 Pearls From Neptune: La Douceur Nocturne (self-released, June 2012)

Compilations 
 Between Spaces (self-released, May 2014)
 EICV7" No. 82 (digitally-released, Everything Is Chemical, August 2014)
 Spaceflight Therapy (self-released, September 2014)
 The Ultraviolet Module (digitally-released, March 2015)

References 

People from Kyoto
Japanese record producers
Living people
Year of birth missing (living people)